Henry Martin Arens (November 21, 1873 – October 6, 1963) was a politician who served in many offices in Minnesota, including the U.S. House of Representatives.

Arens was born as Heinrich Martin Arens in Bausenrode near Fretter in the Kingdom of Prussia, today part of the municipality of Finnentrop, Westphalia, Germany. He immigrated to the United States in November 1889 and was a farmer near Jordan, Minnesota. His first public office was as a member of the board of aldermen for Jordan from 1905 to 1913. He went on to become a member of the Minnesota House of Representatives from 1919 to 1922 and in the state senate from 1923 to 1930.

In 1930, he was elected the 26th Lieutenant Governor of Minnesota and served one two-year term. In 1932 he was elected to the 73rd congress as a member of the Minnesota Farmer-Labor Party. In 1932, all of Minnesota's representatives were elected at large.  He served only one term, from March 4, 1933, to January 3, 1935, the start of the 20th Amendment. He was defeated for re-election in 1934 and again in 1936 when he attempted to retake his seat.

External links 

Inauguration photo

1873 births
1963 deaths
German emigrants to the United States
Lieutenant Governors of Minnesota
Members of the United States House of Representatives from Minnesota
Members of the Minnesota House of Representatives
Minnesota state senators
Minnesota Farmer–Laborites
Farmer–Labor Party members of the United States House of Representatives
People from Jordan, Minnesota